WATT (1240 AM, "News Talk 1240") is a radio station broadcasting a news-talk-sports format. Licensed to Cadillac, Michigan, it began broadcasting in 1946.

External links
FCC History Cards for WATT
Michiguide.com - WATT History

ATT
Radio stations established in 1946
1946 establishments in Michigan